Dilfiroz Kuzdağı (born January 1, 1982) is a Turkish powerlifter competing in the -67 kg division. She represented her country at the 2016 Paralympics.

Early life
Kuzdağı was born on January 1, 1982. She succumbed to poliomyelitispolio as she was seven months old. She became disabled with impaired muscle power.

The mother of two divorced in 2013 as her spouse did not want she performed sport staying away from home for training camps.

Currently, she is a student of coaching education at the School of Physical Education and Sports of Gaziantep University.

Sporting career
Kuzdağı began her sporting career with arm wrestling in 2008, and switched over to powerlifting in 2012.

She was admitted to the national team after winning the Turkish championship. She internationally debuted in 2013 at the IPC Powerliftng European Open Championships in Aleksin, Russia, and became silver medalist by lifting 85 kg. She lifted 95 kg, and won the silver medal at the 2015 IPC Powerlifting European Open  Championships in Eger, Hungary.

She earned a quota spot for the 2016 Summer Paralympics in Rio de Janeiro, Brazil.

As of February 25, 2016, Kuzdağı ranks at seventh place of her weight division in the IPC Powerlifting World Ranking List. She ranks second at European level.

References

Living people
1982 births
Turkish sportswomen
Turkish powerlifters
Female powerlifters
Paralympic powerlifters of Turkey
Powerlifters at the 2016 Summer Paralympics